The Mercedes Benz OM457 Engine is a  displacement inline 6-cylinder 4-stroke Diesel engine. It is one of many motors in the 400 series of engines, being an improved, electronically-managed version of the OM447.
The OM457 has many applications, including trucks, marine, military, municipal, bus and agricultural vehicles, as well as stationary settings. The engine has many differing trim and power levels, ranging from around 250 to 450 horsepower, as well as both a vertically-mounted and, for buses, a horizontally-mounted version (denominated OM 457 hLA).

The engine is water-cooled and is produced using a cast-iron cylinder block, with removable wet type cylinder liners. The engine utilizes diesel fuel delivered in a direct injection method from individual electronically-controlled and camshaft-actuated unit pumps. The cylinder heads are separate units for each cylinder.

The crankshaft is a precision forged unit running in seven three-layer bearings, with counterweights bolted onto the crank webs, much like any other diesel motor of its vintage. The middle bearing is also the thrust bearing. The connecting rods are of a split design, with bronze bushings for the piston pin.

References

Bibliography 

 Daimler Chrysler: Powersystems • Industrial Engines Maintenance and Repair Series 457, 500 and 900 Advanced Training. May 2003

OM352
Diesel engines by model
Straight-six engines